"" ( "Hail to thee, Nicaragua") is the national anthem of Nicaragua. It was approved October 20, 1939, and officially adopted August 25, 1971. The lyrics were written by Salomón Ibarra Mayorga, and it was composed by Ernesto o Anselmo Castinove, with arrangement by Luis A. Delgadillo.

History
The music dates back to the 18th century, when it was used as a liturgical anthem by a Spanish monk, Fr. Ernesto o Anselmo Castinove, when the country was a province of Spain. During the initial years of independence, it was used to salute the justices of the Supreme Court of the State of Nicaragua, then a member of the Central American Federation.

The anthem was eventually replaced by three other anthems during periods of political upheaval or revolution, but it was restored on April 23, 1918 at the fall of the last liberal revolution. A contest was opened to the public, for new lyrics for the national anthem. The lyrics could only mention peace and work, as the country had just ended a civil war. As a result, the Nicaraguan state anthem is one of the only state anthems in Latin America that speaks of peace instead of war.

The new conservative, pro-Spanish government quickly awarded the first prize to Salomon Ibarra Mayorga, a Nicaraguan teacher and poet. It replaced the more warlike "Hermosa Soberana" (Beautiful and Sovereign), an anti-Spanish military march that was seen as an embarrassment in a country with deep Spanish roots. "Hermosa Soberana" was, however, adopted by the Liberal Party as its partisan anthem from 1927 to this day.

Lyrics

References

Notes

External links
Nicaragua: Salve a ti, Nicaragua - Audio of the national anthem of Nicaragua, with information and lyrics (archive link)

National anthems
National symbols of Nicaragua
Spanish-language songs
Nicaraguan songs
North American anthems
National anthem compositions in D major